Ruusulaakso (Finnish for: Rose Valley) is a 1982 novel by Finnish author Kaari Utrio. The novel is about rich Helsinkians in the 1980s, and it is Utrio's only novel that does not have a historical setting. The  included the novel in its list Kirjojen Top 101 that consists of best books written by women.

References

External links
 

20th-century Finnish novels
Novels set in the 1980s
Novels by Kaari Utrio
Finnish romance novels
Tammi (company) books
Contemporary romance novels